Tunavirus (synonyms T1-like phages, T1-like viruses, Tunalikevirus) is a genus of viruses in the order Caudovirales, in the family Drexlerviridae. Bacteria serve as natural hosts. There are currently 14 species in this genus, including the type species Escherichia virus T1.

Taxonomy
The following species are recognized:
 Escherichia virus ADB2
 Escherichia virus BIFF
 Escherichia virus IME18
 Escherichia virus JMPW1
 Escherichia virus JMPW2
 Escherichia virus SH2
 Escherichia virus T1
 Shigella virus 008
 Shigella virus ISF001
 Shigella virus PSf2
 Shigella virus Sfin1
 Shigella virus SH6
 Shigella virus Shfl1
 Shigella virus ISF002

Structure
Tunaviruses are nonenveloped, with a head and tail. The head is about 60 nm in diameter. The tail is about 151 nm long, 8 nm wide. It's non-contractile, flexible, and has four short, kinked terminal fibers.

Genome
Genomes are circular, around 50kb in length. The type species, Escherichia virus T1, and five other species have been fully sequenced. They range between 45-51k nucleotides, with 45-87 proteins. The complete genomes, as well as two other similar, unclassified genomes are available here.

Life cycle
Viral replication is cytoplasmic. The virus attaches to the host cell's adhesion receptor FhuA using its terminal fibers, and ejects the viral DNA into the host cytoplasm via long flexible tail ejection system. Replication follows the replicative transposition model. DNA-templated transcription is the method of transcription. Once the viral genes have been replicated, the procapsid is assembled and packed. The tail is then assembled and the mature virions are released via lysis, and holin/endolysin/spanin proteins. Bacteria serve as the natural host. Transmission routes are passive diffusion.

History
According to ICTV's 1996 report, the genus Tunalikevirus was first accepted under the name T1-like phages, assigned only to family Siphoviridae. The whole family was moved to order Caudovirales in 1998, and the genus was renamed to T1-like viruses in ICTV's 7th Report in 1999. In 2012, it was renamed again to Tunalikevirus. The genus was later renamed to Tunavirus and placed in the newly established family Drexlerviridae.

References

External links
 Viralzone: Tunalikevirus
 ICTV

Caudovirales
Virus genera